Sir Philip Stephens, 1st Baronet (11 October 1723 – 20 November 1809) was a British politician who sat in the House of Commons for 47 years from 1759 to 1806, when he was the last surviving Member of Parliament to have served under George II. In the late 18th century, he was First Secretary of the Admiralty and later a Lord Commissioner of the British Admiralty between 1795 and 1806. He was a friend of Captain James Cook and the Pacific atoll of Caroline Island is named for his daughter. Stephens Island in British Columbia and Port Stephens in New South Wales were named for him.

Life 
Philip Stephens was descended from a family settled for many generations at Eastington in Gloucestershire. He was the youngest son of Nathaniel Stephens, rector of Alphamstone in Essex, and was born there. He was educated at the free school at Harwich, and at an early age obtained an appointment as clerk in the navy victualling office, as his eldest brother, Tyringham Stephens, had previously done.

After his return from his voyage round the world, Rear-admiral George Anson (afterwards Lord Anson) took notice of young Stephens, and had him moved to the admiralty. Stephens afterwards served as Anson's secretary, and was appointed assistant secretary of the admiralty. In 1763 he became secretary, and so continued for upwards of thirty years. He was elected a Fellow of the Royal Society on 6 June 1771, and from 1768 to 1806 he represented Sandwich in the House of Commons, eventually becoming Father of the House.

In 1795 he applied for permission to resign his office at the admiralty, and was then, 17 March, created a baronet and appointed one of the lords of the admiralty. By a special recommendation on 15 October 1806 Stephens, at the age of eighty-one, was granted a pension of £1,600, which he enjoyed till his death on 20 November 1809. He was buried in Fulham church.

His only son, Captain Thomas Stephens, was killed in a duel at Margate in 1790; and his nephew, Colonel Stephens Howe, who was included in the patent of baronetcy, predeceased him. The baronetcy thus became extinct. An elder brother, Nathaniel Stephens, died a captain in the navy in 1747; and two nephews, also captains in the navy, William and Tyringham Howe, died in 1760 and 1783 respectively. Sir Philip's (illegitimate) only daughter, Caroline Elizabeth, married Thomas Jones, 6th Viscount Ranelagh in 1804, but died in childbirth the next year without surviving issue; she was buried in the same vault in Fulham church. With no living descendants, Sir Philip bequeathed his entire estate to Viscount Ranelagh.

Career 

During his 32 years as Secretary to the Admiralty, Stephens was one of the most powerful men in Britain. He was operating at a time of intense Anglo-French rivalry following Britain's success in the Seven Years' War , through France's revanche in the American Revolutionary War and on into the French Revolution. He sent out a cavalcade of navigators to explore the Pacific Ocean, including John Byron, James Cook, William Bligh and George Vancouver.

Notes

References
 
Attrib
 This entry cites:
 Burke's Extinct Baronetcies and Landed Gentry;
Gentleman's Magazine 1809, ii. 1180, 1234;
Faulkner's Fulham, pp. 272–3; Thomson's Royal Society;
Official Returns of Members of Parliament. **Stephens's name is very prominent in the admiralty correspondence of the last half of the 18th century.

|-

1723 births
1809 deaths
Stephens, Philip, 1st Baronet
Members of the Parliament of Great Britain for English constituencies
Members of the Parliament of the United Kingdom for English constituencies
Lords of the Admiralty
British MPs 1754–1761
British MPs 1761–1768
British MPs 1768–1774
British MPs 1774–1780
British MPs 1780–1784
British MPs 1784–1790
British MPs 1790–1796
British MPs 1796–1800
UK MPs 1801–1802
UK MPs 1802–1806
Fellows of the Royal Society